Audette is a surname. Notable people with the surname include:

 Donald Audette (born 1969), Canadian ice hockey forward
 Julien Joseph Audette (1914–1989), Canadian aviator
 Louis Audette (1907–1995), Canadian lawyer, soldier and civil servant
 Michèle Audette (born 1971), Canadian politician and Native American activist
 Yvonne Audette (born 1930), Australian abstract artist

See also
 Audet, surname